is a Prefectural Natural Park in eastern Yamagata Prefecture, Japan. Established in 1951, the park spans the borders of the municipalities of Higashine, Mogami, and Obanazawa. The park's central feature is the eponymous Mount Goshō.

See also
 National Parks of Japan

References

Parks and gardens in Yamagata Prefecture
Higashine, Yamagata
Mogami, Yamagata
Obanazawa, Yamagata
Protected areas established in 1951
1951 establishments in Japan